The 1958 United States Senate election in Mississippi took place on November 4, 1958. Incumbent Democratic U.S. Senator John C. Stennis was re-elected to a third term in office.

Because Stennis was unopposed in the general election, his victory in the August 26 primary was tantamount to election. Stennis was also unopposed in the primary.

Democratic primary
The Democratic primary election was held on August 26, 1958.

Candidates
John C. Stennis, incumbent U.S. Senator

Results

General election

Results

References

Bibliography
 
 

Single-candidate elections
1958
Mississippi
United States Senate